Della M. Hadley (born January 27, 1929, in Lawrence, Kansas) is an American politician who served as a Missouri state representative. She was educated at Lawrence public schools, the University of Kansas, and Purdue University, earning a degree in Political Science. She married Stephen D. Hadley in 1948 in Lawrence, Kansas, with whom she had four children.  They lived in Kansas City, Missouri from 1951 until 1986 when they moved back to the Lawrence area.  Mr. Hadley, a mechanical engineer and a European theater World War II Army veteran, died on February 22, 1990, in Lawrence, Kansas.
  
She was elected to the Kansas City School Board in 1973 (or 1972?). As a member, she was the lead plaintiff in Hadley v. Junior College District of Metropolitan Kansas City, 397 U.S. 50 (1970), a one man-one vote case that was taken to the Supreme Court of the United States.

In 1974, 1976 and 1978 she was elected to the Missouri House of Representatives, serving 6 years total. One of her goals there was to get Missouri to ratify the Equal Rights Amendment to the U.S. Constitution.

References

External links
Della M. Hadley ourcampaigns.com

1929 births
Women state legislators in Missouri
Democratic Party members of the Missouri House of Representatives
Possibly living people